The women's 400 metres at the 2010 IAAF World Indoor Championships was held at the ASPIRE Dome on 12 and 13 March.

Medalists

Records

Qualification standards

Schedule

Results

Heats
Qualification: First 2 in each heat (Q) and the next 4 fastest (q) advance to the semifinals.

Semifinals
Qualification: First 3 in each heat (Q) advance to the final.

Final

References
Heats Results
Semifinals Results
Final Result

400 metres
400 metres at the World Athletics Indoor Championships
2010 in women's athletics